DR Automobiles (previously DR Motor Company) is an Italian automobile company that sells rebadged vehicles from Chinese automakers Chery Automobile and JAC Motors.

History
DR was founded by Massimo Di Risio in 2006. As of 2008, the company had offices in Rome, Campobasso and Pescara.

The company had a network of 20 dealers in Italy at the end of 2018.

Models

DR
 Chery QQ3 / DR Zero (2015–2019) 
 Chery M1 / DR1 / Citywagon / CityCross / CityVan (2009–2014) 
 Chery A1 / DR2 (2010–2014) 
 Chery Tiggo 3x / DR3  (2016–present) a compact SUV 
 JAC Refine S3 / DR4 (2016–2020) SUV
 Chery Tiggo 3 / DR5 (2007–2020) 
 Chery Tiggo 5 / DR6 (2016–2020)
 Chery Tiggo 5x / 4.0 / 5.0 (2020–present) 
 Chery Tiggo 7 / F35 (2020–present)

Sportequipe
Sportequipe is the more premium brand of DR Automobiles launched in 2022 by Massimo Di Risio.
 Chery Tiggo 8 Plus / S8 (2023–present)

References

 
Car manufacturers of Italy
Vehicle manufacturing companies established in 2006
Car brands